Quercus xanthotricha is an Asian species of tree in the beech family Fagaceae. It has been found in northern Indochina (Laos, Vietnam) and in southern China (Yunnan). It is placed in subgenus Cerris, section Cyclobalanopsis.

Quercus xanthotricha is a small tree up to 8 m. tall. Twigs are dark purple. Leaves can be as much as 80 mm long.  The acorn is ovoid to ellipsoid, 9-13 × 7–10 mm, with a scar that is 4–6 mm in diameter.

References

External links

xanthotricha
Plants described in 1938
Trees of Laos
Trees of Vietnam
Trees of China
Taxa named by Aimée Antoinette Camus